Little Beach Hill is a mountain in Barnstable County, Massachusetts. Great Beach Hill is located northeast of Little Beach Hill.

References

Mountains of Massachusetts
Mountains of Barnstable County, Massachusetts